Hans Alfred Herbert Eugen Nieper (23 May 1928 – 21 October 1998) was a controversial German alternative medicine practitioner who devised "Nieper Therapy". He is best known for his claims to be able to treat cancer, multiple sclerosis, and other serious diseases. His therapy has been discredited as ineffective and unsafe.

Early life
Hans Nieper was born in Hanover, Germany on 23 May 1928.

Nieper's fascination for science and medicine came long before he was a doctor. Coming from a family with an extensive background in medicine, Hans Nieper would eventually follow in the family footsteps and become a doctor himself.

Nieper's father was the grandson of Dr. Ferdinand Wahrendorff, founder of the Wahrendorff Psychiatric Hospitals, and son of Dr. Herbert Nieper, who was the Chief Surgeon at the hospital in Goslar, which was later named after him. Nieper's parents were both doctors, and married in 1925. Shortly after marriage, they both began to work at the Wahrendorff Psychiatric Hospital.

Nieper spent most of his time at the Wahrendorff Hospital growing up. Nieper was granted complete intellectual freedom from his parents. As Nieper matured, he was encouraged to participate in stimulated conversations about the nature of the mind, the relationship between biology and mentality, and the validity of orthodox medicine, and to ask questions and raise points on his own. These early years taught Nieper to think analytically, to question orthodox assumptions, and to explore ideas and thoughts without fear of censure or ridicule.

Biography
Born in Germany in 1928, Nieper was educated at Johann Gutenberg University and the University of Freiburg before earning his medical degree at the University of Hamburg. During his career, he served as director for the Department of Medicine at Silbersee Hospital in Hanover and for the German Society for Medical Tumour Treatment. He was also a president of the private club German Society of Oncology, which conducting research of alternative medicine in oncology.

Nieper was among the first researchers to work with lithium orotate. Nieper also patented, along with Franz Kohler, Calcium 2-aminoethylphosphate (Calcium AEP), which he believed could be helpful in combating such diseases as juvenile diabetes, gastritis, ulcer, thyroiditis, Myocarditis and Hodgkin's Disease. However, there is no evidence from reputable clinical trials for the success of the "Nieper Regime" for treating multiple sclerosis utilizing Calcium AEP. The "Nieper Therapy" approach to cancer also uses Calcium AEP, along with selenium. It is based in part around Nieper's belief that cancer is rarer among sharks than other fish and his theory that the lower blood-sodium level of sharks may be the reason; it places among its primary goals the reduction of that sodium in cancer patients. Like his friends Dean Burk and Ernst T. Krebs jr., Nieper was an outspoken opponent of fluoridation.

He died at the age of 70 from a stroke.

Weblinks 
 Hans Nieper In: OTA Report: Pharmacologic and Biologic Treatments, Quackwatch, 3 August 1998
 Stephen Barrett: Be Wary of Nieper Therapy, Quackwatch, 25 June 2006

See also 
List of unproven and disproven cancer treatments
Quackery

References

1928 births
1998 deaths
Alternative cancer treatment advocates
Alternative medicine activists
Health fraud
Johannes Gutenberg University Mainz alumni
Orthomolecular medicine advocates
Medical controversies in Germany
Physicians from Hanover
University of Freiburg alumni
University of Hamburg alumni